Pallekona is a village in Guntur district of the Indian state of Andhra Pradesh. It is the located in Bhattiprolu mandal of Tenali revenue division. It forms a part of Andhra Pradesh Capital Region.

Geography 

Demographics 

The average literacy rate stands at 57.08% with  literates.

Governance 

Pallekona gram panchayat is the local self-government of the village. It is divided into wards and each ward is represented by a ward member.

Education 

As per the school information report for the academic year 2018–19, the village has a total of 8 schools. These schools include 2 private and 6 Zilla/Mandal Parishad.

Transport 

Pallikona railway station provides rail connectivity, which is located on the Tenali-Repalle branch line of Guntur railway division.

See also 
List of villages in Guntur district

References 

Villages in Guntur district